Merry Christmas for You is Yuki Uchida's Christmas-themed mini-album, released in Japan on 22 November 1995 by King Records (reference: KICS-530). It reached number 19 on the Oricon charts. It contains six songs (and a message), including two covers of American songs: Mama ga Santa ni Kiss wo Shita, a cover of Jimmy Boyd's "I Saw Mommy Kissing Santa Claus", and Akahana no Tonakai, a cover of Harry Brannon's "Rudolph the Red-Nosed Reindeer".

Track listing

 
 
 
 
 
 
 

1995 Christmas albums
Yuki Uchida albums